Conilithes antidiluvianus is an extinct species of sea snail, a marine gastropod mollusk, in the family Conidae, the cone snails and their allies.

Distribution
This species occurs in the following locations:
 Italy (type locality)
 Austria
 Bosnia and Herzegovina
 Bulgaria
 Czech Republic
 France
 Hungary
 Romania
 Slovakia
 Syria
 Turkey

References

Conidae